John I (27 December 1350 – 19 May 1396), called by posterity the Hunter or the Lover of Elegance, or the Abandoned in his lifetime, was the King of Aragon from 1387 until his death.

Biography
John was the eldest son of Peter IV and his third wife, Eleanor, who was the daughter of Peter II of Sicily. He was born in Perpignan, capital of the Rousillon, which at that time was part of the Principality of Catalonia, in the Crown of Aragon. He was a man of character, with a taste for verse. He was a Francophile and married Violant of Bar against the wishes of his father, who had wanted him to marry a princess of Sicily. His last marriage was happy. His wife frequently participated in government, since the king was often ill.

Once on the throne, John abandoned his father's relatively Anglophile policy and made an alliance with France. He continued Aragon's support for the Pope of the Avignon line, Clement VII, in the Western Schism. John also made an alliance with Castile, and confirmed in 1388 a treaty with Navarre fixing borders between these kingdoms.

In 1389–90, the Aragonese battled the troops of the Count of Armagnac, John III, who was attempting to conquer the lands of the vassal Kingdom of Majorca. The attack went from Empordà to Girona. The invaders were defeated in 1390 by Aragonese troops commanded by John's brother Martin.

During 1388–90, John gradually lost all lands of the Duchies of Athens and Neopatras in Greece.
In 1391, John promulgated legislation on Jews in different cities of the Kingdom of Aragon. Also in 1391, his administration faced a revolt in the vassal kingdom of Sicily, where the population had proclaimed Louis II of Naples as king.

John was a protector of culture of Barcelona. He established in 1393 the Consistory of Barcelona (jocs florals), imitating the same office in Toulouse.

Aragon had been attempting to subjugate Sardinia since the reign of James II, and gradually the Aragonese had conquered most of the island. However, in the 1380s, the remaining independent principality Arborea became a fortress of rebellion and the Aragonese were rapidly driven back by Eleanor de Bas-Serra. The Aragonese continued in John's reign to attempt to suppress rebels in Sardinia and regain lost territories. However, during John's reign, practically the whole of Sardinia was lost.

John's reign was characterized by disastrous financial administration.

He died during a hunt in forests near Foixà by a fall from his horse. Leaving no sons, he was succeeded by his younger brother Martin.

Family and children
From his first marriage on 24 June 1373 to Martha of Armagnac (18 February 1347 - 23 October 1378), daughter of Count Jean I of Armagnac:
James (Valencia, 24 June 1374 - Valencia, 22 August 1374)
Joanna (Daroca, October 1375 - Valencia, September 1407), who married on 4 June 1392 at Barcelona to Mathieu, Count of Foix. Together they claimed the throne of Aragon after her father's death. Matthew of Foix invaded Aragonese territories, but was driven back by the new King Martin. Joanna died soon after, childless.
John (Barcelona, 23 July 1376 24/31 July 1376)
Alfonso (9 September 1377 1377)
Eleanor (Zaragoza, 13 July 1378 Zaragoza, 1378)

From his second marriage on 2 February 1380 to Yolande of Bar (c. 1365 - 3 July 1431), daughter of Robert I, Duke of Bar and Marie of Valois:
 James (22 March 1382 1 September 1388), Duke of Girona and Count of Cervera
 Yolande (Zaragoza 1384 - Saumur 14 November 1442), married on 2 December 1400 to Louis II of Naples
 Ferdinand (18 March 1389 - Monzón, October 1389), Duke of Girona and Count of Cervera
 Antonia (1391 1392)
 Eleanor (2 January 1393 July 1393)
 Peter (13 January 1394 January 1394), Duke of Girona and Count of Cervera
 Joanna (12 January 4 August 1396)

Ancestors

Notes

References

Sources

 Gómez, Maricarmen: "Música y corte a fines del Medioevo: el episodio del Sur", in Historia de la música en España e Hispanoamérica 1. De los orígenes hasta c. 1470. Madrid-México D.F., Fondo de Cultura Económica, 2009. 

|-

|-

|-

1350 births
1396 deaths
14th-century Aragonese monarchs
People from Perpignan
Monarchs of Majorca
Valencian monarchs
Counts of Barcelona
House of Aragon
Aragonese infantes
People of Byzantine descent
Burials at the Poblet Monastery
Sons of kings